The Coinage of Side refers to numismatic objects produced at Side, an ancient Greek colony in modern-day Pamphylia, Turkey.

490BC—?54AD
The earliest recorded coinage from Side, silver staters, date to approximately 490–400 BC. From this time up until the reign of the Roman Emperor Claudius the coinage of Side is representative of a fine Hellenic style, often featuring the Helmeted busts of Athena on the obverse and the figure of Nike on the reverse. A frequent theme on Side coinage was the pomegranate fruit, as Side was the name for pomegranate in the local language, which is the city's name.

References

Side
Pamphylia